Pauline Kirby (July 9, 1905 – November 10, 1981) was a member of the United States Army Nurse Corps. She was born in Greenwood, Mississippi on July 9, 1905. She held several positions throughout her 30 years of service in the United States Army Nurse Corps and the Army of the United States.

Early life 
Documentation shows that Pauline Kirby lived in Greenwood, Mississippi through 1920 with her widowed mother, Cora Kirby, five siblings, a brother in law, and six other housemates. Kirby attended Baptist Memorial Hospital in Memphis, Tennessee and graduated in 1926.

Service in the United States 
After entering the Army Nurse Corps in 1927, she was assigned to Fort Sam Houston station hospital in Texas. Kirby, with service number N35, was appointed to Second Lieutenant of Army Nurse Corps Reserves on June 5, 1927 and began active duty. On June 30, 1928 Kirby transferred to the Army Nurse Corps. Kirby was promoted to First Lieutenant of the Army Nurse Corps on February 24, 1941. On May 18, 1943 Kirby took position as Major of the Army Nurse Corps. Kirby became Lieutenant Colonel in the Army of the United States on May 1, 1945. On July 15, 1947 she returned to the Army Nurse Corps with the rank of Major. As Lieutenant Colonels, in 1956, Pauline Kirby and Agnes A Maley were the first two members of the Army Nurse Corps allowed to hold the position as temporary Colonels in the Army of the United States. Kirby retired from the Army Nurse Corps on August 31, 1957.

Nursing positions 

From 1942 to 1945, Pauline Kirby was the Assistant Director of Nurses in the South West Pacific during World War II. After her service during World War II, Kirby was a head nurse at Northington General Hospital in Tuscaloosa, Alabama. A year later, in 1946, she obtained another top nursing position at Moore General Hospital in Asheville, North Carolina. Following this, in 1947 Major Kirby began her work as Chief Nurse at Percy Jones General Hospital in Battle Creek, Michigan. Kirby continued at this position until 1949 when she replaced Lieutenant Colonel Katherine E. Hayes of the Army Nurse Corps at Tripler Army Hospital in Hawaii. In December 1952, Kirby left Tripler Army Hospital and was titled Chief of Nursing Service at the Army and Navy Hospital in Hot Springs, Arkansas. On May 3, 1954 Kirby maintained her position as Chief of Nursing Service and relocated to Walter Reed Army Medical Center. In 1957, Colonel Pauline Kirby was recognized as one of eight army nurses that cared for President Dwight D. Eisenhower while he stayed at the Walter Reed Army Hospital due to inflammation of his small intestine. This complication required surgery, which caused him to receive care from June 7 to June 30, 1956.

Neuropsychiatric work 
Pauline Kirby was assistant director of Nursing in the South West Pacific Area. She developed the foundations of the neuropsychiatric hospitals. In this area, the first two hospitals that were designed to accommodate psychiatric disorders were 141st Station Hospital in Mime Bay and 148th Station Hospital in Oro Bay. These hospitals opened in January 1944. As assistant director, Kirby implemented the following regulations::
 All nurses within the psychiatric hospitals must partake in a dynamic psychiatric course.
 All nurses are allowed to be present and give feedback at case conferences for the patients. 
 All nurses must have daily meetings with the ward officers in regards to their patients. 
Following the two model hospitals, the 18th, 171st, 233rd, 116th, 124th, 108th, and 364th Station Hospitals began treatment of psychiatric patients. Assistant Director Pauline Kirby reported information on behalf of these hospitals including job descriptions of all positions within the hospitals.

Death 
Pauline Kirby died in Greenwood, Mississippi on November 10, 1981.

References

1905 births
1981 deaths
People from Greenwood, Mississippi
Female United States Army officers
Military personnel from Mississippi
United States Army Nurse Corps officers